There are numerous Australian Aboriginal languages and dialects, many of which are endangered. An endangered language is one that it is at risk of falling out of use, generally because it has few surviving speakers. If it loses all of its native speakers, it becomes an extinct language.

UNESCO defines four levels of language endangerment between "safe" (not endangered) and "extinct":

 Vulnerable
 Definitely endangered
 Severely endangered
 Critically endangered

List

References

External links 
Some of these sources conflict to some degree with one another.
Aboriginal Australia map, a guide to Aboriginal language, tribal and nation groups published by AIATSIS
AUSTLANG Australian Indigenous Languages Database at AIATSIS
Australian language family trees
Aboriginal and Torres Strait Islander Languages Editor: David Nathan
South Australian Museum

 List
Aboriginal languages
Australian aboriginal